Irma Torres (9 March 1926 - 5 June 2010) was a Mexican film and television actress during the golden age of Mexican cinema.

Career 
Torres began her career in 1944 in the film Maria Candelaria alongside Dolores del Rio and Pedro Armendariz. She went on to star in Flor de caña, where she won an Ariel Award for Best Actress in a Picture in 1949.

References 

Mexican actresses
Actresses from Mexico City
1926 births
2010 deaths